The 940s decade ran from January 1, 940, to December 31, 949.

Significant people
 Al-Radi Abbasid caliph
 Abd al-Rahman III caliph of Córdoba
 Constantine VII of Byzantium
 Al-Muttaqi caliph of Baghdad
 Al-Mustakfi caliph of Baghdad
 Al-Qa'im of Fatimid dynasty
 Al-Mansur bi-Nasr Allah of Fatimid dynasty
 Al-Muti caliph of Baghdad

References